The Anderson Platoon (released in 1966 in Europe, 1967 in the US) is a documentary feature by Pierre Schoendoerffer about the Vietnam War, named after the leader of the platoon - Lieutenant Joseph B. Anderson - with which Schoendeorffer was embedded. Two decades later, a sequel was released as Reminiscence.

Background

In summer 1966, France Soir news magazine director and French public channel ORTF producer Pierre Lazareff proposed that war reporter and director Pierre Schoendoerffer complete the "unachieved" war documentary Schoendoerffer began in 1954.

Back in May 1954, Schoendoerffer was covering the First Indochina War for the French army's cinematographic service SCA. At the siege of Dien Bien Phu, he filmed the battle between the French Union forces and the Viet Minh, but his reels were captured when he surrendered to the enemy.

After French forces departed from Vietnam in 1956, the United States increased their support for the south, culminating in full scale military intervention and the Vietnam War.

Arguing that "the war was the same, the French only switching with the Americans", Lazareff convinced the French veteran to return to Vietnam as a kind of second chance to complete his war documentary.

Premise
The French war cameraman and First Indochina War veteran Schoendoerffer (38), already famous for his celebrated masterpiece The 317th Platoon (1965), returns to Vietnam.

On 1 August 1965, the 1st Cavalry Division (United States) is sent to South Vietnam. The following year in September, Schoendoerffer joins it and follows a 33-man platoon of GIs led by Black West Pointer Lieutenant Joseph B. Anderson (24) until October 1966.

Reception

Anderson Platoon was screened in more than 20 countries and won several prizes, including an Oscar on April 10, 1968, at the Santa Monica Civic Auditorium.
1967: Prix Italia for Original Dramatic Program
1968: Emmy Award for the Best Documentary Film of 1967
1967: Academy Award for Documentary Feature
1968: Merit Award (BBC)

Anderson's comments
Some time after the film was released, Captain Joseph B. Anderson, Jr., the leader of the unit of the US Army's 1st Cavalry Division after whom the film is named, commented on the film (and on his other experiences in Vietnam and in the military, in general).

He observed, on page 227:

Captain Anderson discuses the death from friendly fire of a white soldier named Shannon, from California, who is introduced in the film at approximately 6'50". Anderson states: "I did write a letter to his folks, telling them he did an exceptionally good job. I did not describe the circumstances under which he was killed, because we were directed not to put those kinds of details in letters whatever the case may be."  He continues: "The film describes the grenade as an enemy grenade. Which is not the real circumstances."

Captain Anderson notes: "I spent my last months in the base camp at An Khe, an aide to the commanding general. Being featured in The Anderson Platoon had obviously helped my career."

Releases

Television
The Anderson Platoon was broadcast on the French public channel ORTF's monthly show Cinq colonnes à la une on February 3, 1967.

CBS premiered the English dub version on television in the United States on July 4, 1967. Shortly after its 1968 Academy Award, it was broadcast a second time in France's ORTF.

In West Germany, the 62 min. version was broadcast on July 17, 1968, on NDR, SFB, and Bremen III. After the Berlin wall's fall it was broadcast in Germany, on WDR, on January 15, 1995.

Theater
This documentary was originally made for a French TV show and was released in theaters in the United States only.

Alternate titles

La Section Anderson: original title.
The Anderson Platoon: English re-edited uncensored version title. This is the only accurate account for this title.
2. Kompanie, 1. Zug, Vietnam 1966 ("2nd Company, 1st Platoon, Vietnam 1966"): West German title. The "Anderson Platoon"'s actual name is "1st Platoon". The platoon belongs to the "B" for "Bravo" Company (the second letter in the English alphabet), and the documentary was shot in South Vietnam in 1966, hence the German title.
Abteilung Anderson ("Detachment Anderson"): German title after the reunification. This is a translation of the original title; "Detachment" is a synonym for "Platoon" in French.

Home video
The Anderson Platoon was made available on VHS tapes in the United States only.

A 60 min. VHS re-edited uncensored video edition was released in December 1987 by Hollywood Select Video. It was re-released by Timeless Video in May 1990. Timeless released a second print in June 1999.

By June 2000, Homevision released the original 65 min. French version subtitled in English.

Video on demand
In France it was available online April 26, 2006 as a VOD pay-per-view service through the National Audiovisual Institute's website hosting the ORTF archives.

Reminiscence
A sequel to The Anderson Platoon, entitled Reminiscence, was released in 1989. It depicts Schoendoerffer's meeting the platoon survivors 20 years after the events.

See also
1st Cavalry Division (United States)
Vietnam war
The 317th Platoon (1965)
Platoon (1986)
 Joe Anderson's Interview with West Point Center for Oral History http://www.westpointcoh.org/interviews/before-and-after-the-anderson-platoon-a-lifetime-of-leadership-service-and-achievement  see also http://www.westpointcoh.org/

Media links
  La Section Anderson on the ORTF in 1968, 10 min. sample (National Audiovisual Institute)

References

External links
 Vietnam: la section Anderson at the Institut national de l'audiovisuel
 
 
 
 "How One French Director Brought the Vietnam War Home for Americans" by James T. Quinlivan, published at The National Interest on October 22, 2017

1966 films
1966 documentary films
Best Documentary Feature Academy Award winners
Black-and-white documentary films
Documentary films about the United States Army
Documentary films about the Vietnam War
1960s English-language films
Films directed by Pierre Schoendoerffer
French documentary films
1960s French-language films
Vietnamese-language films
1960s multilingual films
French multilingual films
1960s French films